Nova Venécia Futebol Clube, commonly referred to as Nova Venécia, is a Brazilian professional club based in Nova Venécia, Espírito Santo founded on 27 April 2021. It competes in the Campeonato Brasileiro Série D, the fourth tier of Brazilian football, as well as in the Campeonato Capixaba, the top flight of the Espírito Santo state football league.

Richarlison is one of the team's ambassadors, lending his image for marketing and sponsorship actions.

Honours
 Copa Espírito Santo
 Winners (1): 2021

 Campeonato Capixaba Second Division
 Winners (1): 2021

References

External links
 Nova Venécia on Globo Esporte

Nova Venécia Futebol Clube
Association football clubs established in 2021
Football clubs in Espírito Santo
Football clubs in Brazil
Nova Venécia
2021 establishments in Brazil